Selam (DIK-1/1) is the fossilized skull and other skeletal remains of a three-year-old Australopithecus afarensis female hominin, whose bones were first found in Dikika, Ethiopia in 2000 and recovered over the following years. Although she has often been nicknamed Lucy's baby, the specimen has been dated at 3.3 million years ago, approximately 120,000 years older than "Lucy" (dated to about 3.18 mya).

Discovery 
The fossils were discovered by Zeresenay Alemseged, and are remarkable for their age and condition. On 20 September 2006 the journal Nature presented the findings of a dig in Dikika, Ethiopia, a few miles south of Hadar,  the well-known site where the fossil hominin known as Lucy was found. The recovered skeleton comprises almost the entire skull and torso and many parts of the limbs. The features of the skeleton suggest adaptation to walking upright (bipedalism) as well as tree-climbing, features that correspond well with the skeletal features of Lucy and other specimens of Australopithecus afarensis from Ethiopia and Tanzania. CT-scans of the skull show small canine teeth forming, indicating the specimen is female.

"Lucy's Baby" has officially been named "Selam" (meaning "peace"). The name was published at the announcement of the discovery at the National Museum in Addis Ababa. As part of Ethiopia's Millennium celebration  a commemorative gold coin was minted and given to visiting government officials during the celebration year.

Following is an abstract of the original article describing the baby "Selam", which was authored by Zeresenay Alemseged, Fred Spoor, William H. Kimbel, René Bobe, Denis Geraads, Denné Reed and Jonathan G. Wynn.

A life like image of Selam was published on the front page of the November 2006 issue of National Geographic.

A 2018 examination by DeSilva et al. in Science Advances concluded the hallux of the foot was evidence of hallucal grasping and tree climbing, with an ape-like low and perhaps flat arch of the foot.

Evolution 
Many paleoanthropologists propose that the Homo line derives from A. africanus; in this view it might be better to place Selam in the A. africanus line, since it has more human traits than most A. afarensis (see Homininae).

Implications 
Examination of the shoulder blade and arms  of this specimen has lent support to the idea that Australopithecus afarensis climbed extensively.

See also 

 List of human evolution fossils
 Taung Child (Australopithecus africanus)

References

External links 
 BBC News: "Lucy's Baby" Found in Ethiopia
 Cosmos Magazine: 'Lucy's baby' rattles human evolution
 , Smithsonian Institution's Human Origins program

Australopithecus fossils
Neogene fossil record

it:Australopithecus afarensis#Selam